The National Institute of Cultural Heritage is a government entity of Albania which focuses in protecting, preserving, restoring and revitalizing materials of cultural heritage.

Overview
The institute was founded on 19 December 1965. As an official entity, it is under the umbrella of the Ministry of Culture.
Its task is to enable and enforce legislation with regards to monuments of cultural heritage and their impact on tourism. It strictly cooperates with local governments and other scientific, cultural, and religious organizations in the country.

In 2007, the institute was named after its first director, the architect Gani Strazimiri.

Periodicals

Monumentet, OCLC 3460148.

See also
List of Religious Cultural Monuments of Albania
List of castles in Albania

References

 
 
1965 establishments in Albania
Architecture in Albania
Cultural organizations based in Albania
Albanian studies